Ernie Burnes (29 October 1907 – 4 January 1969) was an  Australian rules footballer who played with Fitzroy in the Victorian Football League (VFL).

References

External links 
		

1907 births
1969 deaths
Australian rules footballers from Victoria (Australia)
Fitzroy Football Club players
Brighton Football Club players